Santos "Sandy" Alomar Conde Sr. (born October 19, 1943) is a Puerto Rican former second baseman who played in Major League Baseball (MLB) for fourteen seasons. Alomar was a switch-hitter and threw right-handed. He is the father of former Major League catcher and current Cleveland Guardians coach Sandy Alomar Jr. and Hall of Fame second baseman Roberto Alomar.

Career
Throughout his career, Alomar was a valuable defensive player. His range and defensive positions were excellent but he was prone to poor throws after making fantastic stops. Alomar was able to play all infield and outfield positions. He led league second basemen in fielding percentage in 1975. Alomar's offense was below-average with a .245 career batting average, 13 home runs and 282 RBI in 1,481 games played. He was, however, a great bunter and gathered a significant number of bunt singles in his career.

Alomar was a smart and aggressive base-runner compiling 227 stolen bases including a career-high 39 in 1971.

A durable player, Alomar was the Angels' everyday second baseman for five years. He twice played a full 162-game season and played in 648 consecutive games between 1969 and 1973.

The only postseason at bat of Alomar's career came with the Yankees, during the 1976 American League Championship Series; he was standing on-deck when Chris Chambliss hit the series-winning home run in Game 5.

After retiring, Alomar became a manager both in his homeland and minor leagues, and coached in the majors for the Chicago Cubs, Colorado Rockies and San Diego Padres. While in San Diego, Alomar coached his two sons, Sandy Jr. and Roberto. .

After the  season, Alomar was hired by the Mets as a bench coach and was moved to first base coach after the  season. In 2007, he was moved to third base coach. On June 17, 2008, he was once again made bench coach of the Mets by former bench coach and recently promoted manager Jerry Manuel. Following the  season, Alomar was let go by the Mets and replaced by Dave Jauss.

See also

 List of Major League Baseball career stolen bases leaders
 List of players from Puerto Rico in Major League Baseball
 List of second-generation Major League Baseball players

External links

1943 births
Living people
People from Salinas, Puerto Rico
Major League Baseball second basemen
Major League Baseball players from Puerto Rico
Major League Baseball bench coaches
Major League Baseball first base coaches
Major League Baseball third base coaches
Milwaukee Braves players
Atlanta Braves players
New York Mets players
Chicago White Sox players
California Angels players
New York Yankees players
Texas Rangers players
American League All-Stars
New York Mets coaches
Chicago Cubs coaches
Colorado Rockies (baseball) coaches
San Diego Padres coaches
Minor league baseball managers
Wellsville Braves players
Davenport Braves players
Boise Braves players
Austin Senators players
Denver Bears players
Atlanta Crackers players
Richmond Braves players
Jacksonville Suns players